Krasnodar is a rural locality (a khutor) in Lugovskoye Rural Settlement, Bogucharsky District, Voronezh Oblast, Russia. The population was 128 as of 2010. There are 2 streets.

Geography 
Krasnodar is located 26 km west of Boguchar (the district's administrative centre) by road. Dantsevka is the nearest rural locality.

References 

Rural localities in Bogucharsky District